Ampulex canaliculata is a species of cockroach wasp in the family Ampulicidae.

References

Parasitic wasps
Articles created by Qbugbot
Insects described in 1823
Ampulicidae